Baritius affinis is a moth of the family Erebidae first described by Walter Rothschild in 1910. It is found in Brazil, French Guiana and Amazonas.

References

Phaegopterina
Moths described in 1910